C. J. Chenier (born Clayton Joseph Thompson, September 28, 1957 in Port Arthur, Texas) is the Creole son of the Grammy Award-winning "King of Zydeco", Louisiana musician, Clifton Chenier. In 1987, Chenier followed in his father's footsteps and led his father's band as an accordion performer and singer of zydeco, a blend of cajun and creole music. With five previous albums to his credit, by 1994, Chenier began to record for Chicago-based Alligator Records.

Career
Chenier grew up in the 1960s, in the housing projects of his native Port Arthur, Texas. There, Chenier was aware of, but not exposed to his father's music as a young child, and had not heard the word Zydeco until later in his youth. Instead, Chenier developed tastes in the 1970s soul, funk and jazz music of James Brown, Funkadelic, John Coltrane and Miles Davis.

Upon first listening to his father's music, Chenier thought all the songs sounded the same. But he eventually began to appreciate and master the zydeco style, as he later joined and then took over his father's band and career. The first instrument Chenier learned to play was the saxophone. As a teenager in the early 1970s he played in black Top 40 bands in Port Arthur. By the mid 1970s Chenier went to college to study music.

In 1978 his father invited Chenier to play his saxophone with the Red Hot Louisiana Band, whose members also included his Uncle, Cleveland Chenier, on washboard. By 1985, as his father was growing ill from diabetes, he invited Chenier to start playing the accordion in a larger role with the band, and to open the shows.

In 1987, the year his father died, Chenier continued his own musical career where his father left off. He has since played such venues as the New Orleans Jazz & Heritage Festival, San Diego's Street Scene and Milwaukee's Summerfest.

Paul Simon first heard Chenier in 1990, and featured him on the album The Rhythm of the Saints, and that year's 'Born At The Right Time' tour. In 1992 Chenier played accordion on "Cajun Song", a track on the Gin Blossoms' album, New Miserable Experience.

1992 saw Chenier featured with the Red Hot Louisiana Band on the PBS music television program Austin City Limits.

By October 1994, Chenier was signed by Alligator. His debut release there was Too Much Fun, named the next year as best zydeco album of 1995 by Living Blues magazine. In 1995, Chenier gained his widest audience to date with television appearances on the Jon Stewart Show and CNN. His 1996 appearance at the New Orleans Jazz & Heritage Festival was featured in a segment by the VH1 cable music television network, as well as by Entertainment Weekly.

Chenier and the band also appeared that year at the Austin, Texas, 1996 SxSW Music Conference, a special event for Alligator Records' 25th anniversary.

Chenier won the 1997 Living Blues' Critics' Poll Award and also an AFIM Indie Award for best zydeco album, for his next release, The Big Squeeze. In 2001, Chenier played in front of 60,000 fans at the Chicago Blues Festival.

In 2001 his recording Step It Up! was released, recorded at Dockside Studios in Maurice, Louisiana.

Discography

C. J. Chenier & The Red Hot Louisiana Band

 Hot Rod (Slash Records), 1990
 My Baby Don't Wear No Shoes (Arhoolie Records), 1992
 Too Much Fun (Alligator Records), 1995
 The Big Squeeze (Alligator Records), 1996
 Step It Up! (Alligator Records), 2001

C. J. Chenier

 I Ain't No Playboy (Slash Records), 1992
 The Desperate Kingdom Of Love (World Village Records), 2006
 Can't Sit Down (World Village Records), 2011

Limited editions

 Live at 2012 New Orleans Jazz & Heritage Festival (Munck Music), 2012 
 Live at 2013 New Orleans Jazz & Heritage Festival (Munck Music), 2013 
 Live at 2014 New Orleans Jazz & Heritage Festival (Munck Music), 2014 
 Live at 2015 New Orleans Jazz & Heritage Festival (Munck Music), 2015 
 Live at 2016 New Orleans Jazz & Heritage Festival (Munck Music), 2016 
 Live at 2017 New Orleans Jazz & Heritage Festival (Munck Music), 2017 
 Live at 2018 New Orleans Jazz & Heritage Festival (Munck Music), 2018 
 Live at 2019 New Orleans Jazz & Heritage Festival (Munck Music), 2019

See also
List of Austin City Limits performers

References

External links
Official C.J. Chenier Website
 
C.J. Chenier YouTube Channel
C.J. Chenier MySpace
Old C.J. Chenier Website
C.J. Chenier Interview NAMM Oral History Library (2019)

1957 births
Living people
Zydeco musicians
People from Port Arthur, Texas
American accordionists
Louisiana Creole people
Zydeco accordionists
21st-century accordionists